Robert Donatucci (May 3, 1952 – November 9, 2010) was a Democratic member of the Pennsylvania House of Representatives, representing the 185th Legislative District from 1980 until his death in 2010.

A native of Philadelphia, Donatucci graduated from Bishop Neumann High School in 1970 and from Temple University in 1974. He was first elected in a special election on March 11, 1980, to succeed his brother Ronald Donatucci, who resigned to become register of wills of Philadelphia County. As a state representative, he served as chair of the House Liquor Control Committee.

References

External links
Pennsylvania House of Representatives – Robert Donatucci (Democrat) - official PA House website
Pennsylvania House Democratic Caucus – Robert Donatucci - official Party website

1952 births
2010 deaths
Democratic Party members of the Pennsylvania House of Representatives
Temple University alumni
Politicians from Philadelphia